The Shri Shankaracharya Engineering College (SSEC) is a unit of Shri Shankaracharya Group of Institutions (SSGI), managed by Shri Gangajali Education Society (SGES) and is named after Adi Shankaracharya. The college offers education in Bachelor of Engineering and MBA.

History
The college, established in 2007, is the second engineering college added to the chain of college/schools managed by SGES, following Shri Shankaracharya College of Engineering and Technology.

Administration
The Governing body comprises representatives of the Society, Nominees of Technical University ( CSVTU ), Bhilai, Nomineers of AICTE ; State Govt. The Director of the college is the ex-officio members secretary of the Governing Body.
All examinations are conducted by CSVTU at the same time for all affiliated engineering colleges.

Location
Bhilai is renowned as the education hub of Chhattisgarh, having many, particularly, engineering colleges.
There are seven railway stations within Bhilai region. The railway station at Durg is widely used for all national trains, as it has major train stoppages along the Howrah-Mumbai line. 
The nearest airport is Swami Vivekananda Airport at the state capital, Raipur, which is about 25 kilometers to the east of Bhilai on the main Howrah–Mumbai rail line, and National Highway 6.

Courses
SSEC offers the following four-year undergraduate degree courses in the following branches:
  Computer Science and Engineering
  Electronics and Telecommunication
  Information Technology.
  Mechanical Engineering.
  Civil Engineering.

The course is divided into eight semesters. The ordinances of CSVTU, are followed in respect of attendance, examination, rules for passing, award of degrees etc.

The college also offers a master's degree in Master of Business Administration.

Departments
SSEC has the following departments:

  Information Technology 
  Computer Science & Engineering
  Electronics & Telecommunication 
  Department of Mechanical Engineering
  Department of Electrical Engineering  
  Master of Business Administration (MBA)
  Applied Physics
  Applied Chemistry
  Applied Mathematics
  Communication Skills
  Civil

Hostel
SGES offers separate boys and girls hostels in different campus. There are four girls hostels and two boys hostels.

See also
 Shri Shankaracharya College of Engineering and Technology
 Shri Gangajali Education Society
 Chhattisgarh Swami Vivekanand Technical University

References

External links
 SSEC home page

Engineering colleges in Chhattisgarh
Education in Bhilai
Educational institutions established in 2007
2007 establishments in Chhattisgarh